The meridian 128° east of Greenwich is a line of longitude that extends from the North Pole across the Arctic Ocean, Asia, Australia, the Indian Ocean, the Southern Ocean, and Antarctica to the South Pole.

The 128th meridian east forms a great circle with the 52nd meridian west.

From Pole to Pole
Starting at the North Pole and heading south to the South Pole, the 128th meridian east passes through:

{| class="wikitable plainrowheaders"
! scope="col" width="130" | Co-ordinates
! scope="col" | Country, territory or sea
! scope="col" | Notes
|-
| style="background:#b0e0e6;" | 
! scope="row" style="background:#b0e0e6;" | Arctic Ocean
| style="background:#b0e0e6;" |
|-
| style="background:#b0e0e6;" | 
! scope="row" style="background:#b0e0e6;" | Laptev Sea
| style="background:#b0e0e6;" |
|-valign="top"
| 
! scope="row" | 
| Sakha Republic — islands of the Lena Delta and the mainland Amur Oblast — from 
|-valign="top"
| 
! scope="row" | 
| Heilongjiang  Jilin — from 
|-
| 
! scope="row" | 
|
|-
| style="background:#b0e0e6;" | 
! scope="row" style="background:#b0e0e6;" | Sea of Japan
| style="background:#b0e0e6;" |
|-
| 
! scope="row" | 
|
|-
| 
! scope="row" | 
| Mainland and the islands of Changseon and Namhae
|-
| style="background:#b0e0e6;" | 
! scope="row" style="background:#b0e0e6;" | East China Sea
| style="background:#b0e0e6;" |
|-
| 
! scope="row" | 
| Okinawa Prefecture — island of Iheya
|-
| style="background:#b0e0e6;" | 
! scope="row" style="background:#b0e0e6;" | East China Sea
| style="background:#b0e0e6;" |
|-
| 
! scope="row" | 
| Okinawa Prefecture — island of Okinawa
|-
| style="background:#b0e0e6;" | 
! scope="row" style="background:#b0e0e6;" | Pacific Ocean
| style="background:#b0e0e6;" | Philippine Sea
|-
| 
! scope="row" | 
| Island of Halmahera
|-
| style="background:#b0e0e6;" | 
! scope="row" style="background:#b0e0e6;" | Halmahera Sea
| style="background:#b0e0e6;" |
|-
| 
! scope="row" | 
| Island of Halmahera
|-
| style="background:#b0e0e6;" | 
! scope="row" style="background:#b0e0e6;" | Kao Bay
| style="background:#b0e0e6;" |
|-
| 
! scope="row" | 
| Island of Halmahera
|-
| style="background:#b0e0e6;" | 
! scope="row" style="background:#b0e0e6;" | Halmahera Sea
| style="background:#b0e0e6;" |
|-
| 
! scope="row" | 
| Island of Halmahera
|-
| style="background:#b0e0e6;" | 
! scope="row" style="background:#b0e0e6;" | Molucca Sea
| style="background:#b0e0e6;" |
|-
| 
! scope="row" | 
| Island of Obira
|-
| style="background:#b0e0e6;" | 
! scope="row" style="background:#b0e0e6;" | Ceram Sea
| style="background:#b0e0e6;" |
|-
| 
! scope="row" | 
| Islands of Seram and Ambon
|-
| style="background:#b0e0e6;" | 
! scope="row" style="background:#b0e0e6;" | Banda Sea
| style="background:#b0e0e6;" |
|-
| 
! scope="row" | 
| Island of Moa
|-
| style="background:#b0e0e6;" | 
! scope="row" style="background:#b0e0e6;" | Timor Sea
| style="background:#b0e0e6;" |
|-
| 
! scope="row" | 
| Western Australia
|-
| style="background:#b0e0e6;" | 
! scope="row" style="background:#b0e0e6;" | Indian Ocean
| style="background:#b0e0e6;" | Australian authorities consider this to be part of the Southern Ocean
|-
| style="background:#b0e0e6;" | 
! scope="row" style="background:#b0e0e6;" | Southern Ocean
| style="background:#b0e0e6;" |
|-
| 
! scope="row" | Antarctica
| Australian Antarctic Territory, claimed by 
|-
|}

See also
127th meridian east
129th meridian east

References

e128 meridian east